The Revenge of Seven is a young adult science fiction novel by Pittacus Lore and the fifth book in the Lorien Legacies series. The book was published by HarperCollins on August 26, 2014.

Plot
The Revenge of Seven picks up exactly where The Fall of Five left off. 
The book is narrated in first person, with Number Four (John), Number Six, and Ella as narrators.

Ella wakes up in a strange place, she sees Mogadorians and tries to escape using the Great Book as a weapon. She realizes that she is in a spaceship. Setrákus Ra claims to be her grandfather. He tries to force her to eat and tells her that he used to be an Elder and that he experimented with altering genetics. He also tells her about how Lorien was controlling everything, and he rivaled it. Then, he puts a binding charm over himself and Ella. The Mogadorians try to force Ella to read the Great Book by blasting an alarm at her whenever she doesn't. Ella rips the book apart. Setrákus Ra talks to her, mentioning her "betrothed". Eventually he arrives. Ella is disgusted to note that she is betrothed to the treacherous Number Five. She finds out that Five killed Eight, and is even more upset. Setrákus Ra trains Ella to use her Legacy Dreynen, using Five as the equivalent of a punching bag. She apologizes to him later telepathically. He responds that he deserved it and that they need to escape. Ella wakes up later to find Five talking about how Mogadorians were bad. She finds out that Five was not aware of their betrothal either. Setrákus Ra catches them. Five stabs Setrákus Ra and the binding charm makes Ella injured as well. She loses consciousness.

John, Sam, Sarah, Malcolm, and Adam, as well as a bunch of Chimæra are staying in an abandoned textile factory. They figure out that the surviving Garde are in Florida, except for one whose dot on the tablet is bouncing everywhere. Adam suggests going to Ashwood Estates instead of predictably going to Florida. The others agree, John with a bit of persuasion required. They find a website titled They Walk Among Us with information about the Mogadorians, and Sarah goes to meet Mark James. Malcolm, John, Sam, and most of the Chimæra go to Ashwood Estates. The Chimæra carry cameras. They survey Mogs carrying equipment, and kill them. Adam admits that the General residing at the Estates is his father. John attacks him, and his shield bracelet is broken. The Chimæra also attack. The General grabs John's neck and squeezes hard. Adam stabs his father through the back. They observe the decomposition of the General's augmented parts. Adam takes up his father's old sword. They stay at the Estates. Adam uses Mogadorian surveillance to see Seven (Marina), Six, and Nine break into the base. Adam hacks a ship and uses its guns to kill all of the Mogadorians.

Six, Marina, and Nine are trying to escape the swamp. They find a town, and see that the Chicago penthouse was destroyed. Marina finds Dale, who claims that there is an old NASA base in the swamp with UFOs flying around it. She believes that Eight's body is there and decides to have Dale lead them there. Nine and Six agree. Marina tells Six that she can feel Eight somewhere. They see Mogadorians from their boat and kill them. Dale is frightened and flees the boat. Seven and Six find a huge Mogadorian base. They turn invisible and enter it. Nine uses his animal telepathy to tell a beast controlled by the Mogadorians to cause a distraction. It obliges but is killed. They make it into a greenhouse. They find Number Five lurking, as well as Number Eight's body. Five stabs a Mogadorian telling him to bring Eight's body to a ship. Six, Seven, and Nine are left with Eight's body. Nine apologizes out loud. Marina says that she forgives him and they hug. A huge Mogadorian ship appears in the doorway and kills all of the Mogadorians. They hear Number Four's voice coming out of the ship and board it. Six "pilots" it to Ashwood Estates, with Adam's instruction. Six and Sam kiss at their return.

Shortly after Seven, Six, and Nine come to Ashwood Estates, Agent Walker and the FBI arrive. They have realized that the Mogadorians are villainous and want to help the Garde. They have seen what happens when someone stops taking the Mogadorian augmentations and they tell the Garde about the plan of the Mogadorians. Their plan is to assassinate the secretary of defense, Bud Sanderson, who was working for the Mogadorians. They believe that his assassination will help stop Setrákus Ra's invasion plan. The next day, Malcolm gathers footage of his mind being dredged. He shows them what he said, that Lorien is not a planet, but an entity, and that it can be awoken in Earth when their Inheritances are put in Calakmul. Four, Sam, and Nine decide to proceed with Walker's plan and go to New York.

Marina, Six, and Adam decide to go to Calakmul. They collect much of the Inheritances to "commit to the earth" and also bring Henri's ashes and Eight's body. On the plane, Marina is hostile toward Adam. She then finds out that he killed his Mogadorian father, and stops. They find a Mogadorian ship trying to contact them. Adam acts authoritative and their ship is allowed entry. When they leave the ship, Phiri Dun-Ra pretends to bargain with him, but hits him on the head. Six and Seven kill the Mogadorians, except for Phiri Dun-Ra. Six, Seven, and Adam pass through a force field and climb. They open a door with three pendants and are transported to a place with Loralite everywhere. They see a cylinder in the ground that looks like a well. They dump the contents of the chests, their pendants, and Henri's ashes down it. Eight's body reanimates. But it isn't him: it's Lorien speaking. It speaks cryptically and annoys Six, but it temporarily resurrects Eight. Eight kisses Marina one last time before disappearing again. But they find out that the Lorien entity is spreading.

Sam, Four, and Walker are driving. On the way, Nine tries to interrogate Sam about Six. Four stops him. Nine claps, wearing a pair of gloves from Marina's chest, and generates a huge noise. The Mogadorians, of course, find them and attack. The heroes are trying to get bystanders to flee. One bystander takes a video of Four using his healing power. They enter the hotel where Sanderson is staying, and see Sanderson. He looks awful and has clearly been taking Mogadorian augmentations. He says that it is too late and then shoots himself in the head. Four somehow stops the bullet with telekinesis and heals him. Sanderson tells them that it is too late to prevent the invasion. A spaceship comes.

Sanderson gives Walker names of politicians working for the Mogadorians. They arrive at Setrákus Ra's planned invasion site. Nine breaks Setrákus Ra's staff, and Ra reverts from his human form to the repulsive genetically modified Mogadorian one. Ra uses Dreynen when Number Four attacks. He would have killed Ella, but Four prevented it. Five stops Four from stabbing Setrákus Ra and killing Ella. Four and Five fight, but Five tells Four about the charm on Ella. Four prevents a wave of bullets from hitting Ra and Ra drags Ella back onto his ship. The warship starts to fire. Sam and Four are separated from everyone else except for a group of human survivors. A Piken was after them. It was knocked down with telekinetic force. The implication is that Sam did it. The book ends after the telekinetic blast, and Sam saying, "Holy shit, did I just do that?"

Characters

John Smith - The narrator of the first book. He also narrates part of this book. He is the fourth member of the Loric Garde. 
Number Six -  The sixth member of the Loric Garde who is Sam's love interest. Six partly narrates The Revenge of Seven.
Sam Goode - John's best friend and Number Six's other love interest. He is the son of Malcolm Goode.
Adamus Sutekh/Adam - A Mogodorian who inherited the thoughts and memories of Number One, and then quickly became a Loric ally. Adam inherited one of One's legacies, the ability to create earthquakes, which was described as a gift.
Marina - She is the seventh member of the Loric Garde. Has healing abilities and was a love interest of Number Eight before his death.
Number Five - The fifth member of the Loric Garde. He killed Number Eight in The Fall of Five and is now an enemy of the Garde.
Ella - She is, unofficially, the tenth member of the Loric Garde. The book opens with her being held captive by Setrákus Ra. Ella also partly narrates The Revenge of Seven.
Number Nine - The ninth member of the Loric Garde in the series. 
Sarah Hart - John's girlfriend from Paradise, Ohio.
Malcolm Goode - Sam's father and one of the nine, and only currently living Greeter, people assigned to help the Loric, start their lives on earth and demonstrate its cultures and way of life.

The series' fan base opinions of The Revenge of Seven have been rather positive, with the novel currently holding a 4.3 rating on GoodReads as of 9 February 2015.

References

2014 American novels
American young adult novels
American science fiction novels
2014 science fiction novels
Children's science fiction novels
Lorien Legacies
HarperCollins books